The 1940 Kilkenny Senior Hurling Championship was the 46th staging of the Kilkenny Senior Hurling Championship since its establishment by the Kilkenny County Board.

On 13 October 1940, Carrickshock won the championship after a 1-04 to 1-02 defeat of Mullinavat in the final. It was their third championship title overall and their first title in two championship seasons.

Results

Final

References

Kilkenny Senior Hurling Championship
Kilkenny Senior Hurling Championship